Victor Varconi (born Mihály Várkonyi; March 31, 1891 – June 6, 1976) was a Hungarian actor who initially found success in his native country, as well as in Germany and Austria, in silent films, before relocating to the United States, where he continued to appear in films throughout the sound era. He also appeared in British and Italian films.

Biography
Born in Kisvárda, Austria-Hungary, Varconi was the first known Hungarian actor to make a film in the United States. He was educated at a commercial school in Hungary, after which he worked for an insurance company as a solicitor. After he developed an interest in acting, he attended the Actor Art High School in Budapest, from which he progressed to acting with the National Theatre in Budapest. While there, he performed in works that included Shakespearean plays and Molnar's Liliom and The Wolf. He went on to act with a Hungarian film company and in U.F.A. films in Berlin.

He worked under contract to Cecil B. DeMille, and played Pontius Pilate in DeMille's 1927 production of The King of Kings. That same year, he played Amos Hart, husband of murderess Roxie Hart, in the first film version of Chicago.
 
Owing in part to his Hungarian accent, Varconi's popularity reportedly waned with the advent of sound films and he was cast in smaller parts, often playing Hispanic characters. He worked on the New York City stage and wrote for radio.

Death
He died from a heart attack in Santa Barbara, California on June 6, 1976 at the age of 85, survived by his second wife, Lilliane. He was interred at the Calvary Cemetery, East Los Angeles, California.

Selected filmography

Márta (1913) - A doktor
The Yellow Foal (1914) - Laci, Csorba fia
The Exile (1915) - Miklós
Bánk Bán (1915) - Ottó herceg
Tetemrehívás (1915)
Éjféli találkozás (1915) - Sugár Laci, pásztor
Havasi Magdolna (1915) - Juon, a parasztlegény
Az ezüst kecske (1916) - János, medikus
A gyónás szentsége (1916) - A meggyilkolt fiatalember
A Nagymama (1916) - Kálmán
Miska the Magnate (1916) - Baracs
Farkas (1917) - Szabó Gyuri
Csaplárosné (1917) - Betyár
A csikós (1917) - Andris, a csikóslegény
A tanítónö (1917) - ifjabb Nagy István
Mágia (1917) - Pál
St. Peter's Umbrella (1917) - Wibra Gyuri 
A Gyurkovics leányok (1917)
A riporterkirály (1917) - Toll Ákos, az ifjú riporter
Az utolsó éjszaka (1917)
A megbélyegzett (1917) - Lévai Kálmán, titkár
Ciklámen (1918) - Lehotai, a férj barátja
Petöfi dalciklus (1918)
A 99-es számú bérkocsi (1918) - Herr mit vielen Namen
The Devil (1918) - Száki János, festõmüvész
Sergius Panin (1918) - Sergius Panin
Hotel Imperial (1918) - Almássy fõhadnagy
A szerzetes (1918) - Majthényi László gróf
A skorpió I. (1918) - Jean Morell
Magic Waltz (1918) - Niki hadnagy
A Métely (1918) - George Dupont, a beteg
Baccarat (1919) - Robert de Chanceroy
Sappho (1919) - Jean Gaussin
White Rose (1919) - Halil Patrona
Kutató Sámuel (1919) - Sámuel
A Legnagyobb bün (1919)
A víg özvegy (1920) - Danilo
Die sieben Todsünden (1920)
Der Mann mit den drei Frauen (1920)
A számüzött (1920)
The Asian Sun (1921) - Sekretär
Aus den Tiefen der Großstadt (1921)
Junge Mama (1921) - Prinz Egon
Nachtbesuch in der Northernbank (1921)
The Red Peacock (1921) - Alfred Germont
Serpolette (1922) - Péter herceg
The Blood (1922) - Dr. Robert Kargert, Advokat
Masters of the Sea (1922) - Captain Scott
A Vanished World (1922) - Matrose Vannoni
Sunken Worlds (1922)
Sodom and Gomorrah (1922) - Priester des Lyzeums - Engel des Herrn
Der Junge Medardus (1923) - Medardus Klähr
Die Lawine (1923) - George Vandeau
Namenlos (1923) - Jean Moeller
Poisoned Paradise: The Forbidden Story of Monte Carlo (1924) - Dr. Bergius
Triumph (1924) - William Silver
Changing Husbands (1924) - Oliver Evans
Feet of Clay (1924) - Bookkeeper
Worldly Goods (1924) - Clifford Ramsay
L'uomo più allegro di Vienna (1925) - William
 Ballettratten (1925) - Intendant Holberg
Dancing Mad (1925) - Edmund Chauvelin
The Last Days of Pompeii (1926) - Glauco
The Volga Boatman (1926) - Prince Dimitri
Silken Shackles (1926) - Tade Adrian
 For Wives Only (1926) - Dr. Rittenhaus
 Fighting Love (1927) - Gabriel Amari
 The Little Adventuress (1927) - George La Fuente
The King of Kings (1927) - Pontius Pilate - Governor of Judea
The Angel of Broadway (1927) - Jerry Wilson
The Forbidden Woman (1927) - Col. Gautier
Chicago (1927) - Amos Hart
Tenth Avenue (1928) - Bob Peters
Sinner's Parade (1928) - Al Morton
The Divine Lady (1929) - Horatio Nelson
Eternal Love (1929) - Lorenz Gruber
Kult ciala (1930) - Czeslaw
You'll Be in My Heart (1930)
The Citadel of Warsaw (1930)
Doctors' Wives (1931) - Dr. Kane Ruyter
The Black Camel (1931) - Robert Fyfe
Men in Her Life (1931) - Count Ivan Karloff
Safe in Hell (1931) - General Emmanuel Jesus Maria Gomez
Doomed Battalion (1932) - Artur Franchini
The Rebel (1932) - Kapitän Leroy, Oberkommandant von St. Vigil
The Song You Gave Me (1933) - Karl Linden
Menace (1934) - Stephen Ronsart
Roberta (1935) - Prince Ladislaw
Mister Dynamite (1935) - Jarl Dvorjak
A Feather in Her Hat (1935) - Paul Anders
The Three-Cornered Hat (1935) - The Miller
Dancing Pirate (1936) - Don Balthazar
The Plainsman (1936) - Painted Horse
Trouble in Morocco (1937) - Kamaroff
Men in Exile (1937) - Colonel Emanuel Gomez
Big City (1937) - Paul Roya
King of the Newsboys (1938) - Wire Arno
Suez (1938) - Victor Hugo
Submarine Patrol (1938) - Vanzano - Italian Naval Chaplain
The Story of Vernon and Irene Castle (1939) - Grand Duke
Mr. Moto Takes a Vacation (1939) - Paul Borodoff
Disputed Passage (1939) - Dr. LaFerriere
Everything Happens at Night (1939) - Cavas
The Man from Dakota (1940) - Col. Kuragen (uncredited)
Strange Cargo (1940) - Fisherman
The Sea Hawk (1940) - Gen. Aguirre
Federal Fugitives (1941) - Otto Lieberman aka Dr. Frederic Haskell
Forced Landing (1941) - Hendrick Van Deuren
Reap the Wild Wind (1942) - Lubbock
My Favorite Blonde (1942) - Miller
They Raid By Night (1942) - Col. Otto von Ritter
For Whom the Bell Tolls (1943) - Primitivo
Undercover (1943) - Enemy Security Officer (uncredited)
The Hitler Gang (1944) - Rudolph Hess
The Story of Dr. Wassell (1944) - Captain of the 'Janssen' (uncredited)
Scotland Yard Investigator (1945) - Jules
Dakota (1945) - Frenchman (uncredited)
Unconquered (1947) - Captain Simeon Ecuyer
Where There's Life (1947) - Finance Minister Zavitch
Pirates of Monterey (1947) - Capt. Cordova
Samson and Delilah (1949) - Lord of Ashdod
The Man Who Turned to Stone (1957) - Dr. Myer
The Atomic Submarine (1959) - Dr. Clifford Kent (final film role)

References

External links

 
 
 
 
 
 Photographs and literature

1891 births
1976 deaths
People from Kisvárda
Hungarian male silent film actors
20th-century Hungarian male actors
American male film actors
American male silent film actors
American male television actors
Hungarian emigrants to the United States
Austro-Hungarian emigrants to the United States
20th-century American male actors
Burials at Calvary Cemetery (Los Angeles)